Transformers: Revenge of the Fallen – The Score is a soundtrack that features the musical score by composer Steve Jablonsky for the 2009 live-action motion picture Transformers: Revenge of the Fallen. It was released physically on June 23, 2009. The score was first released as a digital download in the United Kingdom on June 12, 2009.

Track listing
The tracks were announced on June 10, 2009. The following tracks are listed in order:

Credits and personnel
 "NEST" contains instrumental excerpt of "New Divide" written and performed by Linkin Park, produced by Mike Shinoda
Score composed by Steve Jablonsky
 Album produced by Steve Jablonsky, Bob Badami and Ramiro Belgardt
Executive soundtrack album producer: Michael Bay
Executive in Charge of Music for Paramount Pictures: Randy Spendlove
Album Compiled by Katia Lewin Palomo
Music Recorded & Mixed by Alan Meyerson
Orchestra Conducted by Nick Glennie-Smith
Orchestrators: Bruce Fowler, Suzette Moriarty, Walter Fowler, Rick Giovinazzo, Penka Kouneva, Elizabeth Finch, and Kevin Kaska
Music Consultant: Bob Badami
Music Production Services: Steven Kofsky, Mike Shinoda
Supervising Music Editor: Peter Snell
Additional Music by Lorne Balfe
Ambient Music Design by Clay Duncan, Howard Scarr, and Andrew Kawczynski
Music Programming: Ryeland Allison
Featured Vocalist: Lisbeth Scott
Featured Guitarists: George Doering, Heitor Pereira
Ethnic Winds: Pedro Eustache
Featured Cellist: Martin Tillman
Bass: Nico Abondolo
Choir Conducted by: Gavin Greenaway
Choir Coordinator: Andrew Zack
Music Preparation by Booker White
Music Contractors: Peter Rotter, Sandy DeCrescent
Additional Recordings by Jeff Biggers and Albert Clay
Engineering Assistant: Katia Lewin Palomo
Technical Score Engineers: Doug Clow and Pieter Schlosser
Synth Programming by Hans Zimmer and Jacob Shea
Music Technical Assistant: Noah Sorota
Score Mixed at Remote Control Productions
Score Recorded at Sony Scoring Stage
Album Mastered by Louie Teran at Marcussen Mastering
Music published by Paramount Bella Music (BMI)/Songs of SKG (BMI)
Album Art Direction by BLT

Reception

References

Revenge of the Fallen – The Score
Film scores
2009 soundtrack albums